Under Milk Wood is a 1972 British drama film directed by Andrew Sinclair and based on the 1954 radio play Under Milk Wood  by the Welsh writer Dylan Thomas, commissioned by the BBC and later adapted for the stage. It featured performances by Richard Burton, Elizabeth Taylor, Siân Phillips, David Jason, Glynis Johns, Victor Spinetti, Ruth Madoc, Angharad Rees, Ann Beach, Vivien Merchant, and Peter O'Toole as the residents of the fictional Welsh fishing village of Llareggub.

Plot

Along the Welsh coast lies a village called Llareggub - or "bugger all" backwards - which is peopled with eccentrics like Captain Cat (Peter O'Toole), a seafaring man who is losing his sight; the sexy Rosie Probert (Elizabeth Taylor); and Mr. Waldo (Ray Smith), a jack-of-all-trades who is full of regret. The story is told by Richard Burton's character.

Cast

Production

The film was shot primarily on location in Wales and has since acquired a reputation among aficionados as a cult movie. "The film, beautifully photographed and spoken, casts the brooding spell of Thomas’ verse in its reconstruction of the seaside village and the daily round of its inhabitants", wrote Andrew Sinclair in the  International Herald Tribune.

The filming took place in Lower Town, Fishguard, Wales. The choice of location caused protest from some in Laugharne, the town forty miles away (60 km) where Thomas had written the play; an official there said, "To film Under Milk Wood anywhere but Laugharne would be as absurd as filming James Joyce's The Dubliners in Birmingham."

Jacquemine Charrott Lodwidge was the film's production researcher.

Reception
In The Times, John Russell Taylor wrote:

Taylor concluded that "the final effect is to leave one wondering what, precisely, is the point of the exercise".

In The Guardian, Derek Malcolm wrote:

Legacy
In December 2012 the director of the film, Andrew Sinclair, gave the film rights to the people of Wales.

References

External links
 
 

1972 films
British drama films
1972 drama films
Films about dreams
Films based on works by Dylan Thomas
Films set in Wales
Films shot in Wales
Welsh-language films
Films directed by Andrew Sinclair
1970s English-language films
1970s British films